In the physical sciences, relaxation usually means the return of a perturbed system into equilibrium.
Each relaxation process can be categorized by a relaxation time τ. The simplest theoretical description of relaxation as function of time t is an exponential law  (exponential decay).

In simple linear systems

Mechanics: Damped unforced oscillator
Let the homogeneous differential equation:

model damped unforced oscillations of a weight on a spring.

The displacement will then be of the form . The constant T is called the relaxation time of the system and the constant μ is the quasi-frequency.

Electronics: RC circuit
In an RC circuit containing a charged capacitor and a resistor, the voltage decays exponentially:

The constant  is called the relaxation time or RC time constant of the circuit. A nonlinear oscillator circuit which generates a repeating waveform by the repetitive discharge of a capacitor through a resistance is called a relaxation oscillator.

In condensed matter physics

In condensed matter physics, relaxation is usually studied as a linear response to a small external perturbation. Since the underlying microscopic processes are active even in the absence of external perturbations, one can also study "relaxation in equilibrium" instead of the usual "relaxation into equilibrium" (see fluctuation-dissipation theorem).

Stress relaxation
In continuum mechanics, stress relaxation is the gradual disappearance of stresses from a viscoelastic medium after it has been deformed.

Dielectric relaxation time

In dielectric materials, the dielectric polarization P depends on the electric field E. If E changes, P(t) reacts: the polarization relaxes towards a new equilibrium. It is important in dielectric spectroscopy. Very long relaxation times are responsible for dielectric absorption.

The dielectric relaxation time is closely related to the electrical conductivity. In a semiconductor it is a measure of how long it takes to become neutralized by conduction process. This relaxation time is small in metals and can be large in semiconductors and insulators.

Liquids and amorphous solids
An amorphous solid such as amorphous indomethacin displays a temperature dependence of molecular motion, which can be quantified as the average relaxation time for the solid in a metastable supercooled liquid or glass to approach the molecular motion characteristic of a crystal. Differential scanning calorimetry can be used to quantify enthalpy change due to molecular structural relaxation.

The term "structural relaxation" was introduced in the scientific literature in 1947/48 without any explanation, applied to NMR, and meaning the same as "thermal relaxation".

Spin relaxation in NMR

In nuclear magnetic resonance (NMR), various relaxations are the properties that it measures.

Chemical relaxation methods

In chemical kinetics, relaxation methods are used for the measurement of very fast reaction rates. A system initially at equilibrium is perturbed by a rapid change in a parameter such as the temperature (most commonly), the pressure, the electric field or the pH of the solvent. The return to equilibrium is then observed, usually by spectroscopic means, and the relaxation time measured. In combination with the chemical equilibrium constant of the system, this enables the determination of the rate constants for the forward and reverse reactions.

Monomolecular first-order reversible reaction 
A monomolecular, first order reversible reaction which is close to equilibrium can be visualized by the following symbolic structure:

A <=> B

In other words, reactant A and product B are forming into one another based on reaction rate constants k and k'.

To solve for the concentration of A, recognize that the forward reaction (A ->[{k}] B) causes the concentration of A to decrease over time, whereas the reverse reaction (B ->[{k'}] A) causes the concentration of A to increase over time.

Therefore, where brackets around A and B indicate concentrations.

Substituting this value for [B] in terms of [A]0 and [A](t) yields
 which becomes the separable differential equation 

This equation can be solved by substitution to yield

In atmospheric sciences

Desaturation of clouds

Consider a supersaturated portion of a cloud. Then shut off the updrafts, entrainment, and any other vapor sources/sinks and things that would induce the growth of the particles (ice or water). Then wait for this supersaturation to reduce and become just saturation (relative humidity = 100%), which is the equilibrium state. The time it takes for the supersaturation to dissipate is called relaxation time. It will happen as ice crystals or liquid water content grow within the cloud and will thus consume the contained moisture. The dynamics of relaxation are very important in cloud physics for accurate mathematical modelling.

In water clouds where the concentrations are larger (hundreds per cm3) and the temperatures are warmer (thus allowing for much lower supersaturation rates as compared to ice clouds), the relaxation times will be very low (seconds to minutes).

In ice clouds the concentrations are lower (just a few per liter) and the temperatures are colder (very high supersaturation rates) and so the relaxation times can be as long as several hours. Relaxation time is given as
 where:
D = diffusion coefficient [m2/s]
N = concentration (of ice crystals or water droplets) [m−3]
R = mean radius of particles [m]
K = capacitance [unitless].

In astronomy
In astronomy, relaxation time relates to clusters of gravitationally interacting bodies, for instance, stars in a galaxy. The relaxation time is a measure of the time it takes for one object in the system (the "test star") to be significantly perturbed by other objects in the system (the "field stars"). It is most commonly defined as the time for the test star's velocity to change by of order itself.

Suppose that the test star has velocity v. As the star moves along its orbit, its motion will be randomly perturbed by the gravitational field of nearby stars. The relaxation time can be shown to be 

Various events occur on timescales relating to the relaxation time, including core collapse, energy equipartition, and formation of a Bahcall-Wolf cusp around a supermassive black hole.

See also
Relaxation oscillator
Time constant

References

Time in physics
Time in astronomy
Celestial mechanics
Equations of astronomy

fr:Constante de temps